This is a list of works by the Latvian composer Aivars Kalējs classified by genre (2011- period and list of transcriptions are incomplete).

Orchestral music 
 Concertino for piano and orchestra, op. 11 (1971/73)
 Elegy, for symphony orchestra, op. 12 (1973)
 Agnus Dei, for mixed choir and chamber orchestra, op. 49a (1992/2003) 
 De profundis, for symphony orchestra, op. 56 (1997/2000)
 Musica dolente, for symphony orchestra, op. 65 (2001/2003), dedicated to the innocent victims of the tragic events of September 11, 2001

Organ music 
Variations, op. 9 (1970)
Phantasie - Dithyramb, op. 14 (1972/1976) 
Melody, op. 16 (1975) 
Fanfaras, op. 21 (1975)
Chaconne, op. 24 (1978)
Improvisation on the word ALAIN, op. 27 (1979)
Symphonic poem Fireworks, op. 32 (1981)
Dorian variations, op. 44 (1984, 1986)
Variazioni antichi,  op. 45 (1989)
Per aspera ad astra, op. 46 (1989)
Toccata on the Janis Medins’ choir song Tev mūžam dzīvot, Latvija! op. 48 (1990)
Via dolorosa, op. 49 (1992) 
Lamento (1992)
Lux aeterna (hommage a O. Messiaen), op. 51 (1995)
Toccata on the Chorale Allein Gott in der Höh sei Ehr, op.57 (1998), cello and organ arrangement (2004) 
Postlude hommage a Jehan Alain, op. 59 (1999)
In Paradisum, op. 58 (1999)
Prayer, op.62 (2001)
Cantus Memento 1941! (2002)
Prelude on the G. F. Handel's theme Joy to the World! (2005)
Lux aeterna II (2005)
Musica dolente (2006) 
Chorale Sonata (2009)
Solitudinem faciunt, in memory of victims in Zolitūde shopping centre roof collapse op. 100 (2013/2016)
Toccata in C, for organ duo (2014), trio version with percussions (2015)
Ceremonial March (2016)
Perpetuum mobile (2016)
Himna dzimtenei - Hymn for Homeland (2018)

Piano music

Cycles 

Children's cycle Saules stars - Ray of Sunlight (1975)
Piano cycle French Album, op. 55, 11 works, ≈60 min. (1997)
Le stagioni per sotto voce (Seasons in an Undertone), op. 61 (2000)
Piano cycle for young pianists En mouvement (In Motion) (2001/2009)

Other 

Prelude op. 1 (1967)
Three dances op. 2 (1968)
Variations op. 3 (1969)
Divas dainas (Two Folk Songs) op. 5 (1969)
Sonata, op. 10 (1971)
Sonatina, op. 22 (1977)
Retro Suite, op. 25 (1978)
Impulse, op. 23 (1978)
Saucieni I, II - Calls I, II, op. 29 (1979, 80)
Garīgais un laicīgais - Spiritual and Timely, 3 works, op. 33 (1982)
Diatonic toccata variations, op. 45 (1985)
Waltz, op. 48 (1991)
Trois Gymnopédies (2003)
Deuxième nocturne (2002)
Consolation (2003)
Vita nuova (2004)
Trois postludes à la mémoire de ma mere- Three postludes in the memory of my mother (2004)
Deux etudes (2004/2005) 
L’ile douce - Firest Isle (2005)
Tango (2006)
Canzonetta (2007)
Gymnopèdies n.4 and n.5 (2007)
Rūsa - Heat Lightning, in memory of Ādolfs Skulte, op. 84 (2009)

Chamber music

Instrumental chamber music 
Suite, for oboe and piano (1970)
Three works, for violin and piano, op. 14 (1975)
Dialogues I, II, III, for cello and piano, op. 13 (1975)
Vēja dziesma (Wind Song), for flute and piano, op. 37 (1984)
Toccata, for violin solo, op. 40 (1985)
Waltz, for violin and piano, op. 48 (1991)
Rendez-vous sous le pluie, for piccolo flute, and piano op.55a or piccolo flute, violin and piano (1997/2016)
Elevation, for violin / flute and organ, op. 52 (1991)
Le jeune fille au cheval couleur de lin for oboe and piano / violin, oboe or flute and piano, op. 55b (1999/2016)
Viator Dei, for French horn / viola / cello and organ / piano (2005)
Via crucis for organ, bells and timpani (1996/2011)
Toccata on a Lutheran Chorale Ļauj mums tagad sirsnīgi priecāties! for organ, bells and timpani (2011)
Die alte Standuhr for viola and organ / piano
Laika rits ir neapturams... for viola and organ / piano
Fugue on the Chorale Ein Feste Burg ist unser Gott and Blues, for saxophone quartet and organ (2017)

Vocal chamber music 
2 songs, for voice and piano, op. 4, text by Laimonis Vāczemnieks, Egils Plaudis, (1969)
2 songs, for voice and piano, op. 7, text by Charles van Lerberghe (1970)
Three arrangements of Latvian folk songs, for voice and piano
Aiz upītes es uzaugu, for voice, flute and piano, op. 36/3
Ave Maria, for mezzo-soprano / alto / baritone and piano / organ, op. 64/2 (2002)
Ave Maria, for soprano / tenor and piano / organ, op. 64/1 (2002)
Deux Madrigaux, for soprano, flute and piano, text by Victor Hugo, Amadis Jamyn
Songs of Innocence, for soprano, (tenor), flute and piano, text by William Blake (2007)
Arrivée des Exotes en forme d’un Rondo, for soprano and organ (2010)
Spiritual evening songs, for tenor, alto-saxophone and organ (2016)

Choir music 
Five mixed choir songs: Zelta tvaiks Text – Jānis Rainis • Torņi Text – Egils Plaudis • Tad apstājās laiks Text – Imants Ziedonis • Vocalize Dzimtenes ainava • Zvana vārdi Text – Vizma Belševica
For mixed choir: Autumn with flute, oboe un cello / piano • Spring Madrigal with oboe and piano (harpsichord), op. 8 Text – Victor Hugo, Amadis Jamyn (1970)
Mana dzimtene - My homeland, for women's choir, op. 19 (1976) Text by Egils Plaudis
Variations on a theme from a midsummer song from the Talsi region, for mixed choir, op. 28 (1979)
Latvian folk songs arr. for mixed choir and piano: Sniga sniegi putināja with oboe, Visu dienu bites dzinu with English horn, op. 30b (1980)
Seven Scandinavian folk song arr., for mixed choir, op. 31 (1980) 
Two French folk song arr. for mixed vocal ensemble or choir & piano, op. 35/1 (1983)
Two folk dances, for mixed vocal ensemble or choir, op. 34 (1983)
Old Joe Clark, American folk song arr., for mixed choir and piano, op. 35/2 (1983)
Seven arrangements of songs by Andris Kārkliņš (El Leton) with lyrics by Ojārs Vācietis, for mixed vocal ensemble or choir with guitar or piano, op. 36/1-2 (1984) 
Songs of Innocence - Bezvainības dziesmas, for chamber choir, flute and organ or piano, op. 38 (1984), for female / children's choir, flute and organ / piano (2016) Poetry by William Blake
Two songs with lyrics by Mirdza Ķempe, for mixed choir and piano, op. 42 (1985)
Saule Laimu aicināja, for mixed choir and piano, op. 41 (1985) Text by Marga Tetere
Pavane, for mixed choir, op. 39 (1985) Text by Oliver Goldsmith
Chorales, for the Evangelic Lutheran Hymnal, op. 53 (1997)
Aizvestie - The Departed, for mixed choir (2005) Text by Kārlis Skalbe

Transcriptions for organ
J.S. Bach - Final Chorus from St Mattheus Passion
J.S. Bach - Sinfonia in D Major from Cantata BWV 29

Scores
Sheet music - Toccata for violin solo by Kalējs
Sheet music - Songs of Innocence for female / children's choir, flute, organ / piano
Sheet music - "Via Dolorosa" by Kalējs
Sheet music - Per aspera ad astra by Kalējs
Sheet music - Toccata on the Chorale "Gloria in excelcis Deo"/"Allein Gott in der Höh sei Ehr" by Kalējs
Sheet music - Edition Peters - Kalējs, Aivars "Prayer" (Lūgšana)
Sheet music - Two Madrigals for soprano, flute/oboe and piano by Kalējs
Sheet music - Pique-nique à la Manière de Manet for soprano and piano by Kalējs
Sheet music and records - Aivars Kalējs

External links
 Aivars Kalējs Homepage - List of works
 Latvian Music Information Centre - Aivars Kalējs

Kalejs, Aivars